A Roundhead was a supporter of the Parliamentarian side during the English Civil War.

Roundhead or round head or variant, may also refer to:

Places
 Roundhead Township, Hardin County, Ohio, USA
 Roundhead, Ohio, USA; an unincorporated community
 Roundhead, a peak near Fredericksburg, Texas, USA
 Roundhead Butte, a peak in the Buffalo Plateau of southern Montana, USA
 Round Head Mountain, a peak in Lausanne Township, Carbon County, Pennsylvania, USA
 Roundhead Mountain, a peak near Stanley, Virginia, USA

Arts and entertainment
Round Head Period, a period of Saharan neolithic art
 The Roundheads, a Doctor Who novel
 Roundhead Studios, a New Zealand-based music and sound recording studio owned by Neil Finn
 Round Heads, a fictional group in the 1936 play Round Heads and Pointed Heads

Biology
 Longfin, also known as Roundhead, a family of fish
  Roundhead galaxias (Galaxias anomalus), a species of galaxiid fish
 Roundhead, a common name occasionally used for mushrooms of the genus Stropharia

Other uses
 Roundhead (weapon), a type of mace used during the English Civil War
 Roundhead (Wyandot) (c. 1760–1813), a Native American chief of the Wyandot tribe who fought in the War of 1812
 The Round-Heads, an ethnic stereotype referring to the Atikamekw

See also

 
 Round (disambiguation)
 Head (disambiguation)